Charles Law may refer to:
 Charles's law, also known as the law of volumes, experimental gas law which describes how gases tend to expand when heated
 Charles Law (British politician) (1792–1850), British judge and Conservative Party MP
 Charles B. Law (1872–1929), United States Representative from New York

See also
 Charles Towry-Law, 3rd Baron Ellenborough (1820–1890), son of the politician above
 Charles Towry-Law, 4th Baron Ellenborough (1856–1902), son of the 3rd Baron